Gilberto García Roa (born 19 August 2000) is a Mexican professional footballer who plays as a midfielder for Liga de Expansión MX club Tapatío, on loan from Liga MX club Guadalajara.

Career statistics

Club

References

External links
 
 
 

2000 births
Living people
Association football midfielders
Liga de Expansión MX players
Liga MX players
C.D. Guadalajara footballers
Footballers from Jalisco
People from Tlaquepaque
Mexican footballers